Frank Bennett may refer to:
 Frank Bennett (actor) (1890–1957), American silent film actor
 Frank Bennett (American football) (1879–1936), college football player
 Frank Bennett (baseball) (1904–1966), American baseball pitcher
 Frank Bennett (ice hockey) (1923–1996), Canadian ice hockey player
 Frank Bennett (occultist) (1868–1930), Australian occultist
 Frank Bennett (politician) (1895–1946), Newfoundland politician
 Frank Bennett (scholar) (1866–1947), English academic and Anglican cleric
 Frank Bennett (singer) (born 1959), Australian singer
 Frank Moss Bennett (1874–1952), British painter
 Frank P. Bennett (1853–1933), American journalist, magazine publisher and politician
 Frank P. Bennett Jr. (1878–1965), American politician, banker and editor
 Frankie Bennett (born 1969), English footballer
 C. Frank Bennett, American pharmacologist

See also
 Francis Bennett (disambiguation)